Ron Stone is an American personal manager, and musician's advocate.  Stone is outspoken on Internet piracy and has worked to influence legislation on the issues of digital music, file sharing, and musician's intellectual property distribution rights.

Biography

Early years
After moving from The Bronx to Los Angeles, Stone (born Ronald Goldstein) opened the hippie clothing store "The Great Linoleum Clothing Experiment" in 1967, doors down from The Troubadour. Stone began his career during music’s ‘golden age’ in 1968 at Geffen and Roberts Management alongside industry names such as David Geffen, Stone's childhood friend Elliot Roberts, and Irving Azoff where Stone helped to manage the careers of Neil Young, Joni Mitchell, The Eagles, Crosby, Stills, Nash and Young, Bob Dylan, The Band, Devo and America and Tom Cochrane.

Career
Stone went on to form Gold Mountain Entertainment with Danny Goldberg and Burt Stein. They signed Bonnie Raitt and Belinda Carlisle, managing the careers of these artists, who then experienced a multi-platinum career resurgence. Later, with John Silva as a partner, Gold Mountain guided the careers of Nirvana, Beastie Boys, Beck, Rickie Lee Jones, Foo Fighters, Sonic Youth, Tracy Chapman, Ziggy Marley, The Baha Men, Joss Stone, and many others.

Currently, Gold Mountain represents Ray Davies, Joan Osborne, Lynn Goldsmith, Fastball (with Peter Wark), and Sophie B. Hawkins. Gold Mountain’s Nashville office represents Ronnie Milsap, Todd Snider, and Hard Working Americans. Stone was also founder and president of Something Music record company in partnership with Tony Valenziano and Kevin Day from Rocket Science.

In partnership with Curb Musifilms, Ron Stone Productions produced the feature film "The Harvest." Stone founded and ran World Domination Records in partnership with Dave Allen (Gang of Four and Apple/Beats) for ten years. He also founded and ran Rock-it-comics for five years. Stone’s knowledge of the Internet and new technology led him to consult on digital and copyright issues with the RIAA.

Napster 
Stone leveraged his stature in the entertainment industry during the Internet boom to be a spokesman for the rights of artists whose intellectual property and content were distributed freely via peer-to-peer applications like Napster.

When commenting on how file sharing has devalued music, Stone commented: “Music for a generation has become disposable and it used to be a collectible.” Stone targeted Napster when he said “It is the single most insidious website I’ve ever seen…it’s like a burglar’s tool”

With Stone's counsel, Napster was sued by the Recording Industry Association of America on behalf of record labels for enabling piracy on an 'unprecedented scale'. The legal issue is whether Napster was materially contributing to infringement of copyright, even if the company doesn't actually store the offending files. Stone says he has found unauthorized copies of all his artist's songs through Napster. He, with a team of industry members, created a series of television, radio and web commercials urging the public to stop using the program.

Personal life 
Stone is currently resides in Vail, Colorado with his wife of 57 years.

References

External links
 Ron Stone interview on Artist Managers as entrepreneurs - Midem, June 2015
 Story about the Summer of Love - Variety, 2017
 Personal Managers Hall Of Fame, 2018
 The Bob Lefsetz Podcast: Ron Stone. Oct, 2019

American music industry executives
Living people
1944 births